The Hilton Munich Airport (until 31 December 2014 Kempinski Hotel Airport Munich) is a hotel located on the grounds of Munich Airport, between Terminals 1 and 2, near the Munich Airport Center business facility.

Following a construction period of 20 months, the hotel opened on 17 May 1994, two years after the airport went into operation. The architect of the hotel is German-born Helmut Jahn of the Chicago-based Murphy/Jahn Architectural Group. The hotel's grand plaza is a 24- metre high and 1400 square metre large atrium hall with a glass roof and decorated with palm trees (18 metres tall) from Florida. Green cubes and grown-over pyramid shapes continue the outer landscape surrounding the airport.

On 1 January 2015, the hotel was taken over by Hilton Hotels & Resorts. In March 2017, a 7-story extension building was completed adding 162 rooms spanning over 6 floors and new office spaces on the first floor. The existing office facilities on the ground floor of the old building were converted into conference facilities.

See also
List of hotels in Germany

References

External links
 Hilton Munich Airport (in English and German)

Hotels in Munich
Hotel buildings completed in 1994
Hotels established in 1994
1994 establishments in Germany